Stary Młyn may refer to the following places:
Stary Młyn, Greater Poland Voivodeship (west-central Poland)
Stary Młyn, Masovian Voivodeship (east-central Poland)
Stary Młyn, Chojnice County in Pomeranian Voivodeship (north Poland)
Stary Młyn, Kwidzyn County in Pomeranian Voivodeship (north Poland)
Stary Młyn, Tczew County in Pomeranian Voivodeship (north Poland)